The Port Deposit Gneiss is a Paleozoic gneiss formation in Cecil County, Maryland. It is described as a "Moderately to strongly deformed intrusive complex, chiefly composed of quartz diorite gneiss.  Rock types include gneissic biotite-quartz diorite, hornblende-biotite-quartz diorite, and biotite granodiorite, with minor amounts of quartz monzonite and hornblende-quartz diorite.  Moderate protoclastic foliation grades into strong cataclastic shearing." It intrudes into the Volcanic Complex of Cecil County.

Quarrying
The Port Deposit Gneiss has been quarried along the east as well as the west bank of the Susquehanna River for over 100 years.

Port Deposit Gneiss was used in:
 Many houses and five churches in Port Deposit
 Schools like the U.S. Naval Academy, Haverford College and The Catholic University of America
 Fort McHenry, Fort Delaware and Fort Carroll
 Public buildings like the Boston Public Library and the U.S. Treasury Building
 Public works like the Concord Point Lighthouse, Lincoln Tunnel and the St Augustine seawall

References

Harford County, Maryland
Geology of Maryland